Where's Weed is an American cannabis technology company known for connecting medical and recreational cannabis users with trusted local marijuana businesses in their communities.

History
Where's Weed was founded in 2011  with its headquarters located in Denver, Colorado. Tyler Bartholomew is the current CEO and one of the co-founders of the company. The company launched the Where's Weed Android app in 2014 and released the iOS version in 2015.

Services
Where's Weed offers marijuana enthusiasts the platform to search, discover and share marijuana businesses and products in their local communities. The Where's Weed mobile apps help users search for both medical and recreational marijuana dispensaries, strains and products.

See also
 Cannabis (drug)
 Cannabis in the United States
 Cannabis dispensaries in the United States
 Legality of cannabis by U.S. jurisdiction
 Cannabis in California
 Medical cannabis
 Medical cannabis in the United States

References

Privately held companies based in Colorado
Technology companies of the United States
American companies established in 2011